Athrotaxis is a genus of two to three species (depending on taxonomic opinion) of conifers in the cypress family, Cupressaceae. The genus is endemic to western Tasmania, where they grow in high altitude temperate rainforests.

They are medium-sized evergreen trees, reaching 10–30 m (rarely 40 m) tall and 1-1.5 m trunk diameter. The leaves are scale-like, 3–14 mm long, are borne spirally on the shoots. The cones are globose to oval, 1–3 cm diameter, with 15-35 scales, each scale with 3-6 seeds; they are mature in 7–9 months after pollination, when they open to release the seeds. The male (pollen) cones are small, and shed their pollen in early spring.

They are very susceptible to bush fires, and have declined markedly in abundance due to accidental and deliberate fires since the European colonisation of Tasmania.

Taxonomy 
A 2021 molecular study found the Athrotaxidoideae to be the sister group to the Sequoioideae, which contains famously massive species such as the coast redwood (Sequoia sempervirens) and giant sequoia (Sequoiadendron giganteum). This is despite both subfamilies' current distributions being on entirely different hemispheres. The study indicates that both taxa diverged during the mid to late Jurassic.

Species
The three taxa of Athrotaxis are variously treated as three distinct species, or as two species, with the third taxon being a hybrid between the other two. To date, the evidence has been inconclusive, with some data suggesting hybrid origin, but other evidence suggesting the third is distinct and not a hybrid.

Cultivation and uses
The wood is scented and durable, and was extensively used in the past in Tasmania, but is now too rare for any cutting. All three make very attractive ornamental trees with luxuriant foliage, though they are generally only planted in arboretums or botanical gardens. Cultivation away from their native range is successful only in areas with high rainfall, mild winters, and cool summers, such as the British Isles, the Pacific Northwest of North America, and New Zealand.

Examples of the species and many of its leaf forms may be seen in the living collections at The Tasmanian Arboretum.

References

Cupressaceae
Pinales of Australia
Endemic flora of Tasmania
Conifer genera